Rodovia Jornalista Francisco Aguirre Proença (SP-101) is a state highway in the State of São Paulo which connects the cities of Campinas, Hortolândia, Monte Mor, Elias Fausto and Capivari. Its first 25 kilometers are double-laned, the rest is still single-laned. The road has a high traffic because along its way there are several large companies in the services and industry sectors, such as EMS Sigma Farma, Dow Chemical, Bosch, IBM and others. It's also known as Rodovia Campinas-Monte Mor.

See also
 Highway system of São Paulo
 Brazilian Highway System

References

Transport in Campinas
Highways in São Paulo (state)